The Major Indoor Soccer League (MISL) was the top professional indoor soccer league in the USA. The league was a member of both the United States Soccer Federation and FIFA. The MISL replaced the NPSL which folded in 2001. This version of the MISL recognizes NPSL history which dates back to 1984 when the NPSL was started as the AISA.  A complete summary of the MISL team-by-team and season-by-season record book is defined within the contents of this section.

Baltimore Blast

Championships 
1983–1984 MISL Champions 
2002–2003 MISL Champions
2003–2004 MISL Champions
2005–2006 MISL Champions
2007–2008 MISL Champions
2009  NISL Champions
2012–2013 MISL Champions

Division titles
1992–1993 NPSL American Division (as Baltimore Spirit)
1993–1994 NPSL American Division (as Baltimore Spirit)
1999–2000 NPSL East Division 
2003–2004 MISL Eastern Division

Year-by-year record

California Cougars

Championships                                                  
 None

Division titles    
 None

Year-by-year record

Chicago Storm

Championships
 None

Division titles
 None

Year-by-year record

Detroit Ignition

Championships
 None

Division titles
 2006–07 MISL Regular season champions
 2007–08 MISL Regular season champions

Year-by-year record

Milwaukee Wave

Championships
1997–1998 NPSL Champions
1999–2000 NPSL Champions
2000–2001 NPSL Champions
2004–2005 MISL Champions

Division titles
1997–1998 NPSL Central Division
1999–2000 NPSL North Division
2000–2001 NPSL National Conference
2001–2002 MISL regular season champions
2002–2003 MISL Western Division
2003–2004 MISL Central Division
2004–2005 MISL regular season champions

Year-by-year record

Monterrey La Raza

Championships
 None

Division titles
 None

Year-by-year record

New Jersey Ironmen

Championships
 None

Division titles
 None

Year-by-year record

Orlando Sharks

Championships
 None

Division titles
 None

Year-by-year record

Philadelphia Kixx

Championships
 2001–2002 MISL Champions
 2006–2007 MISL Champions

Division titles
 1997–1998 NPSL East Division
 1998–1999 NPSL East Division
 2002–2003 MISL Eastern Division

Year-by-year record

References

Major Indoor Soccer League (2001–2008)
History of sport by team